Scotch bonnet (also known as Bonney peppers, or Caribbean red peppers) is a variety of chili pepper named for its supposed resemblance to a Scottish tam o' shanter bonnet. It is ubiquitous in West Africa as well as the Caribbean. Like the closely related habanero, Scotch bonnets have a heat rating of 100,000–350,000 Scoville units. For comparison, most jalapeño peppers have a heat rating of 2,500 to 8,000 on the Scoville scale. However, completely sweet varieties of Scotch bonnet called cachucha peppers are grown on some of the Caribbean islands.

Scotch bonnets are used to flavor many dishes and cuisines worldwide and are often used in hot sauces and condiments. The Scotch bonnet has a sweeter flavor and stouter shape, distinct from its habanero relative with which it is often confused, and gives jerk dishes (pork/chicken) and other Caribbean dishes their unique flavor. Scotch bonnets are mostly used in West Africa, West Indian, Sri Lankan, and Maldivian cuisines and pepper sauces, though they often show up in other Caribbean recipes.  It is also used in Nicaragua, Costa Rica and Panama for Caribbean-styled recipes such as rice and beans, rondón, saus, beef patties, and ceviche. 

Fresh, ripe Scotch bonnets can change from green to yellow to scarlet red; some varieties of this pepper can ripen to orange, yellow, peach, or even a chocolate brown.

See also

 Bajan pepper sauce
 Caribbean cuisine
 Cuisine of Jamaica
 Cuisine of Nigeria
 Cuisine of Trinidad and Tobago
 Jamaican jerk spice
 List of Capsicum cultivars
 Nagabon

References

External links
 

Capsicum cultivars
Caribbean cuisine
Costa Rican cuisine
Chili peppers
Flora of Jamaica
Guyanese cuisine
Maldivian cuisine
Nicaraguan cuisine
Panamanian cuisine
Sri Lankan cuisine
Surinamese cuisine
West African cuisine